Raffaella Buonsanti (born 1981 in Matera, Italy) is an Italian chemist and material scientist. Her research is at the interface between materials chemistry and catalysis as she focuses on the synthesis of nanocrystals to drive various energy-related reactions, such as CO2 reduction. She is currently a tenure-track assistant professor at École Polytechnique Fédérale de Lausanne (EPFL) and director of the Laboratory of Nanochemistry for Energy located at EPFL's Valais campus.

Career 
Buonsanti received in 2006 her Master's degree in chemistry from the University of Bari, Italy, with a thesis supervised by Pantaleo Davide Cozzoli and Angela Agostiano. She then joined the research group of Pantaleo Davide Cozzoli at University of Salento, Italy, and graduated in 2010 with a PhD in nanoscience. In 2010, she moved as a postdoctoral researcher to the Molecular Foundry of the Materials Science Department at Lawrence Berkeley National Laboratory, where she became project scientist in 2012. In 2013, she gained a position as tenure-track staff scientist at the Joint Center for Artificial Photosynthesis at Lawrence Berkeley National Laboratory. She was appointed as a tenure-track assistant Professor at École Polytechnique Fédérale de Lausanne in 2015 and has since lead the Laboratory of Nanochemistry for Energy located at EPFL's Valais campus in Sion, Switzerland.

Research 
Buonsanti’s research focuses on the interface of materials sciences and catalysis. Her interdisciplinary approach encompasses chemistry, material chemistry and chemical engineering, and aims at rendering energy technologies more sustainable. She is interested in the synthesis of novel colloidal nanocrystals that can be used as controlled and adaptable electrocatalysts for the value-added conversion of small molecule. In particular, Buonsanti's research group is keen to gain an understanding of the mechanisms of the electrochemical CO2 reduction reaction.

Distinctions 
Buonsanti has been a board member of the Early Career Advisory Board for ACS Materials Letters, the Scientific Advisory Board for Chemistry of Materials, and Scientific Reports. She is a member of the Swiss Chemical Society (2016), the Royal Society of Chemistry (2017), and the Materials Research Society (2015).

In 2019, she was awarded the ChemComm Emerging Investigator Lectureship, and in 2018, she received the Endowed Chair from the Sandoz Family Foundation. In 2013 she received the R&D 100 Award for the Universal Smart Window Coating.

Publication

External links 
 Website of the Laboratory of Nanochemistry for Energy
 
 Raffaella Buonsanti's profile on Scopus

References 

Academic staff of the École Polytechnique Fédérale de Lausanne
University of Bari alumni
Living people
Italian materials scientists
1981 births
Italian women scientists